Fabio Augusto Justino (born June 16, 1974), known as Fabinho, is a former Brazilian football player.

Club statistics

References

External links

geocities.jp

1974 births
Living people
Brazilian footballers
Brazilian expatriate footballers
Expatriate footballers in Japan
J1 League players
Shimizu S-Pulse players
Vissel Kobe players
Association football forwards